Russell Boardman (1898–July 1, 1933) was an early American aviation pioneer who, along with John Polando, flew from Floyd Bennett Field to Istanbul, Turkey in 1931 to set an aviation record for the longest continuous distance flown without refueling. Before this achievement, he was also a stunt pilot for the film Hell's Angels.

Biography

Early life
Born in 1898 on a farm in Connecticut, Boardman flew as a stunt pilot for the Howard Hughes film Hell's Angels. He met John Polando at a "Wall of Death" motorcycle event in Revere where Boardman was a rider. Polando decided that Boardman would make a good co-pilot due to his aviation maintenance skills, and the two teamed up and began to pursue a dream of breaking a world record.

Record attempt
The two men trained at Hyannis Airport in preparation for their trip to Istanbul.

The attempt at the record took place between July 28 and 30, 1931. Boardman and John Polando took off from Floyd Bennett Field in the aircraft Cape Cod. Eighteen minutes later, Clyde Edward Pangborn and Hugh Herndon, Jr. took off from Floyd Bennett in an unsuccessful attempt to circumnavigate the world. Boardman and Polando then flew over Newfoundland and dropped the New York Times at lighthouses in the province. Along the way, they also flew over Ireland, Paris, and Munich. They also circled the Swiss Alps at night to avoid crashing into them. While it was originally planned for them to fly to Moscow, it was determined that Istanbul would be easier, because it would allow for them to still break the record.

Following the landing of their aircraft in Istanbul, they were greeted with great fanfare.

Death and legacy
Boardman died on July 1, 1933, as a result of injuries sustained when his Gee Bee Model R crashed upon take-off following a fuel stop at Indianapolis. At the time of the crash, he was competing for the Bendix Trophy.

In 1981, the airfield at Barnstable Municipal Airport was renamed Boardman/Polando Field to recognize their accomplishment.

References

1898 births
1932 deaths
Flight distance record holders
Aviators from Connecticut
American aviation record holders